COVID-19 Response Acceleration Task Force was a task force that coordinates and oversees the Indonesian government's efforts to accelerate the mitigation of the COVID-19 pandemic. It was established on 13 March 2020, coordinated by Indonesian National Board for Disaster Management, involves Ministry of Health, Indonesian National Police, and Indonesian Armed Forces. The task force executive board was led by Indonesian National Board for Disaster Management head Doni Monardo, with Coordinating Minister for Human Development and Cultural Affairs Muhadjir Effendy as the head of advisory board.

The task force was dissolved on 20 July 2020 according to Perpres Nomor 82 Tahun 2020 (Presidential Regulation No. 82 of 2020).

Background 

A man from the Netherlands may have been the first confirmed coronavirus patient in Indonesia when he fell ill there in January. He was treated in three hospitals while he was ill in East Java in January 2020. Indonesia banned all flights from and to Mainland China starting from 5 February. The government also stopped giving free visa and visa on arrival for Chinese nationals. Those who live or have stayed in Mainland China in the previous 14 days have been barred from entering or transiting through Indonesia. Indonesians are discouraged from travelling to China.

The Ministry of Health ordered the installation of thermal scanners for at least 135 airport gates and port docks, and announced that provisioning over 100 hospitals with isolation rooms (to WHO-recommended standards) would begin. On 2 March 2020, President Joko Widodo confirmed the first two cases of COVID-19 in the country in a televised statement. According to the Minister of Health Terawan Agus Putranto, the patients contracted the virus from an infected Japanese person in Depok who later tested positive in Malaysia. Both Indonesian patients were subsequently hospitalized at Sulianti Saroso Infection Center Hospital, North Jakarta. Starting on 4 March, Jakarta MRT also began scanning the temperature of passengers entering the stations and denying access to those with symptoms of high fever.

Starting on 8 March, travel restrictions expanded to include Daejeon and Gyeongsangbuk-do in South Korea, Lombardy, Veneto and Emilia-Romagna regions of Italy, and Tehran and Qom in Iran Visitors with travel history within these countries but outside the aforementioned regions have to provide a valid health certificate during check in for all transportation into Indonesia. Despite the restriction on travellers from South Korea, Indonesia is still allowing flights from South Korea. The first confirmed death of coronavirus in the country occurred on 11 March 2020. However, one of Telkom employees died on 3 March when tested positive COVID-19 on 14 March and also infecting his wife and child. On 13 March, the government designated 132 treatment facilities across Indonesia.

Members

Executive board

Advisory board

References

External links
 Official website

COVID-19 pandemic in Indonesia
Organizations established for the COVID-19 pandemic
Task forces
National responses to the COVID-19 pandemic